The Chrysler Team Championship was an unofficial event on the PGA Tour from 1983 to 1990. It used a two-man better-ball format. It was played at Boca West Resort and Club and Broken Sound Country Club in Boca Raton, Florida from 1983 to 1986; at Palm Beach Polo Club, Wellington Club and Greenview Cove Country Club in West Palm Beach, Florida from 1987 to 1988; at Palm Beach Polo Club (Cypress and Dunes courses) and  Wellington Club in 1989; and at Binks Forest Country Club and Wellington Club in Wellington, Florida in 1990. In its final year it was known as the Sazale Classic.

At the 1985 Chrysler Team Championship, five teams tied for first. The crowded playoff featuring ten players was won on the first extra hole when Hal Sutton made a birdie putt.

Winners
Sazale Classic
1990 Fred Couples & Mike Donald

Chrysler Team Championship
1989 David Ogrin & Ted Schulz
1988 George Burns & Wayne Levi
1987 Mike Hulbert & Bob Tway
1986 Gary Hallberg & Scott Hoch
1985 Raymond Floyd & Hal Sutton
1984 Phil Hancock & Ron Streck
1983 Johnny Miller & Jack Nicklaus

References

PGA Tour unofficial money events
Golf in Florida
Recurring sporting events established in 1983
Recurring sporting events disestablished in 1990
1983 establishments in Florida
1990 disestablishments in Florida